Indium(III) iodide or indium triiodide is a chemical compound of indium and iodine with the formula InI3.

Preparation 
Indium(III) iodide is obtained by evaporation of a solution of indium in HI.

Properties 
Distinct yellow and red forms are known. The red form undergoes a transition to the yellow at 57 °C. The structure of the red form has not been determined by X-ray crystallography; however, spectroscopic evidence indicates that indium may be six coordinate. The yellow form consists of In2I6 with 4 coordinate indium centres.

References 

Iodides
Indium compounds
Metal halides